"Dark as the Night" is an American television film broadcast on June 18, 1959 as part of the CBS television series, Playhouse 90.  The cast includes Laraine Day and Michael Wilding.

Plot
An English lawyer runs for Parliament and his American wife decides to leave him at the height of the campaign. A London gossip columnist blackmails the lawyer after discovering an attractive jewel thief in the lawyer's house. The drama climaxes after the woman disappears.

Cast
The cast included the following:

 Laraine Day - Lauren Hughes
 Michael Wilding - Chris Hughes
 Dennis Price - Percy
 Sheila Allen - Iris
 Michael Hordern - Griffith
 Bill Owen - Peters
 Hermione Baddeley - Rose
 Sydney Tafler - Club Manager
 Marianne Stone - Ellen
 Ronald Allen - Tommy

Production
The program was filmed in London, the first episode of Playhouse 90 produced outside the United States. It aired on June 18, 1959, on the CBS television network. Terence Young was the director and Nicole Milinair the producer. Marc Brandell wrote the teleplay as an adaptation of the story by James Hadley Chase.

References

1959 American television episodes
Playhouse 90 (season 3) episodes
1959 television plays